Lindsay Davenport and Corina Morariu defeated Mariaan de Swardt and Elena Tatarkova in the final, 6–4, 6–4 to win the ladies' doubles tennis title at the 1999 Wimbledon Championships.

Martina Hingis and Jana Novotná were the defending champions, but did not compete together. Hingis partnered with Anna Kournikova but withdrew before the tournament. Novotná competed with Natasha Zvereva, but lost in the semifinals to de Swardt and Tatarkova.

Seeds

  Jana Novotná /  Natasha Zvereva (semifinals)
  Martina Hingis /  Anna Kournikova (withdrew)
  Alexandra Fusai /  Nathalie Tauziat (second round)
  Serena Williams /  Venus Williams (withdrew)
  Elena Likhovtseva /  Ai Sugiyama (second round)
  Lisa Raymond /  Rennae Stubbs (third round)
  Lindsay Davenport /  Corina Morariu (champion)
  Larisa Neiland /  Arantxa Sánchez Vicario (third round)
  Mariaan de Swardt /  Elena Tatarkova (final)
  Irina Spîrlea /  Caroline Vis (third round)
  Conchita Martínez /  Patricia Tarabini (second round)
  Mary Joe Fernández /  Monica Seles (quarterfinals)
  Els Callens /  Julie Halard-Decugis (second round)
  Virginia Ruano Pascual /  Paola Suárez (third round)
  Barbara Schett /  Patty Schnyder (first round)
  Cara Black /  Irina Selyutina (second round)
  Cătălina Cristea /  Ruxandra Dragomir (first round)
  Debbie Graham /  Lori McNeil (first round)

Qualifying

Draw

Finals

Top half

Section 1

Section 2

Bottom half

Section 3

Section 4

References

External links

1999 Wimbledon Championships on WTAtennis.com
1999 Wimbledon Championships – Women's draws and results at the International Tennis Federation

Women's Doubles
Wimbledon Championship by year – Women's doubles